= Barkhedi Hajjam =

- village
- Location within Madhya Pradesh Location within India
- Coordinates: 23.405471°N 77.3755084°E
- Country: India
- State: Madhya Pradesh
- District: Bhopal
- Tehsil: Huzur
- Elevation: 486 m (1,594 ft)

Population (2011)
  - Total: 648
- Time zone: UTC+5:30 (IST)
- ISO 3166 code: MP-IN
- 2011 census code: 482397

Barkhedi Hajjam is a village in the Bhopal district of Madhya Pradesh, India. It is located in the Huzur tehsil and the Phanda block.

== Demographics ==
According to the 2011 census of India, Barkhedi Hajjam has 145 households. The effective literacy rate (i.e. the literacy rate of population excluding children aged 6 and below) is 69.27%.

Demographics (2011 Census)
	Total	Male	Female
Population	648	337	311
Children aged below 6 years	111	51	60
Scheduled caste	269	136	133
Scheduled tribe	0	0	0
Literates	372	235	137
Workers (all)	326	185	141
Main workers (total)	224	156	68
Main workers: Cultivators	139	104	35
Main workers: Agricultural labourers	76	48	28
Main workers: Household industry workers	0	0	0
Main workers: Other	9	4	5
Marginal workers (total)	102	29	73
Marginal workers: Cultivators	27	2	25
Marginal workers: Agricultural labourers	72	26	46
Marginal workers: Household industry workers	0	0	0
Marginal workers: Others	3	1	2
Non-workers	322	152	170
